Roger Sherman Greene (1881–1947) was a diplomat, foundation official, medical administrator in China and a national leader in affairs relating to East Asia. He was the fourth son and sixth of eight children of Rev. Daniel Crosby Greene, a Congregational minister, and Mary Jane (Forbes) Greene. His parents, descendants of colonial Massachusetts families, had been among the earliest American missionaries in Japan, arriving in 1869 and serving until their deaths (the mother's in 1910, the father's in 1913); they were deeply involved in bringing modern Western education to the Japanese during the Meiji era. Two of their other children achieved prominence, Evarts Boutell as an American historian at Columbia and Jerome Davis Greene as a foundation administrator, banker, and secretary of the Corporation of Harvard University.

Roger Greene was born in Westborough, Mass., while his parents were on furlough in the United States. After earlier schooling in Japan, he entered Harvard, from which he received a B.A. degree in 1901 and an M.A. the following year. He then obtained a position with the consular service and over the next twelve years held posts in Brazil, Japan, Siberia, and China; at Hankow (1911–1914) he performed with distinction as consul general during the Chinese revolution. Perhaps as a result of his missionary heritage, Greene became uncomfortable in his role as agent of the interests of the United States, feeling an obligation to mankind more broadly conceived. He therefore surrendered a highly promising diplomatic career to accept in 1914, an opportunity to join in the philanthropic activities of the Rockefeller Foundation, of which his brother Jerome was then secretary.

Greene began as a member of the foundation's commission which surveyed the medical and public health needs of China. The commission's recommendations led to the establishment, later in 1914, of the China Medical Board, to foster medical education in China through the improvement of hospitals and medical schools and the granting of fellowships to missionary and Chinese physicians. Wallace Buttrick of the General Education Board accepted the directorship of the board, and Greene was made resident director in China. He remained in China until 1935, becoming director of the China Medical Board in 1921 and serving from 1927 to 1929 as vice-president of the Rockefeller Foundation in the Far East. He also took a particular interest in one of the board's projects, the Peking Union Medical College, and became acting director in 1927.

During his years with the China Medical Board, Greene developed close ties with China's westernized intellectuals, most notably the philosopher-diplomat Hu Shih. He was deeply involved in projects directed toward the modernization of China, especially in the field of public health. He also kept up a steady correspondence with members of the Department of State responsible for American policy toward China. With China torn by civil strife in the 1920s, Greene urged a policy of noninterference, arguing that the Chinese were entitled to the freedom that Americans had enjoyed in the 1860s: the freedom to fight their civil war until one side won a decisive victory and could unify and determine the future of the country. In 1927-1928 he led a group of Americans in Peking, mostly missionaries, who successfully opposed a plan by the American minister for intervention in cooperation with the other great powers. Greene's opinion carried special weight at this time because Nelson T. Johnson, his former protégé in the consular service, had taken over responsibility for East Asian affairs within the State Department.

Tension developed, however, between Greene and the Rockefeller Foundation. This was partly the result of Greene's character and style. To many he seemed the archetypical New Englander, austere, righteous, and rigid; and he was, indeed, highly principled and uncompromising. He regarded with contempt the increasing involvement of John D. Rockefeller III in China Medical Board affairs and would do nothing to appease that young man's sensibilities. A host of financial issues, born of the board's depression-ridden desire to cut expenses, served as irritants, but the major issue became the future of the department of religion at Peking Union Medical College. In founding the college in 1916, John D. Rockefeller, Jr., had acquired the facilities of a British missionary medical school and had declared his intention to continue the school's religious atmosphere. Greene, however, had come to believe that the effort to instill Christianity in medical and nursing students was an anachronism in modern China. As Chinese nationalism grew more intense in the 1920s and 1930s, both students and faculty objected to the department of religion. Regarding the department as expendable during the budget crisis, Greene fought hard for his beliefs, but lost out in a confrontation with the Rockefellers. He resigned from the China Medical Board in 1934, and later the same year, by direction of the board, submitted his resignation from the Peking Union Medical College as of July 1935.

Greene emerged from semi-retirement in the late 1930s as a leader in organizations formed to work for the support of China and Great Britain against Japan and Germany. From 1938 to 1941 he served as chairman of the American Committee for Non-Participation in Japanese Aggression and from 1940 to 1941 as associate director of William Allen White's Committee to Defend America by Aiding the Allies. For both organizations he lobbied with federal officials for American assistance to China. More than any other private citizen, Greene had the attention of Stanley K. Hornbeck, the State Department's powerful senior advisor for Far Eastern Affairs. Almost alone, he kept the Committee to Defend America from focusing its entire campaign on the war in Europe.

Ill health curtailed Greene's activities shortly before Pearl Harbor, but he was able during the war to serve part-time as a consultant to the State Department's Division of Cultural Relations. He maintained a deep interest in Chinese affairs, and while he gradually, with misgivings, came to regard the Kuomintang as China's best hope, he was outraged by the attacks on John S. Service and other Americans who had reported favorably on Chinese Communist activities. He also lent active encouragement to the development of East Asian studies in the United States. Greene's home in his later years was Worcester, Massachusetts. He died in West Palm Beach, Florida, of cardiac failure and chronic nephritis and was buried in Westborough, Mass. He was survived by his wife, Kate Brown, whom he had married on May 8, 1920, and their two children, Edward Forbes and Katharine Curtis.

He was also the great-great grandson of American founding father Roger Sherman.

Further reading

[Greene's papers, at Harvard, are a basic source. There is MS material also in the files of the State Department (Nat. Arch.); of the China Medical Board and Rockefeller Foundation, N.Y. City; of the Am. Committee for Non-Participation in Japanese Aggression (Harvard); and of the Committee to Defend America by Aiding the Allies (Princeton). Greene's activities in China can be traced in the Annual Reports of the Rockefeller Foundation. Other references include Mary E. Ferguson, China Medical Board and Peking Union Medical College (1970); Who Was Who in America, II (1950); obituary (with photograph) in N.Y. Times, Mar. 29, 1947. Information on family background can be found in Evarts B. Greene's biography of his father, A New Englander in Japan (1927). Death record from Fla. Bureau of Vital Statistics.]

Sources
"Roger Sherman Greene." Dictionary of American Biography, Supplement 4: 1946-1950. American Council of Learned Societies, 1974. Reproduced in Biography Resource Center. Farmington Hills, Mich.: Thomson Gale. 2005. http://galenet.galegroup.com/servlet/BioRC
The Chinese Connection: Roger S. Greene, Thomas W. Lamont, George E. Sokolsky and American-East Asian Relations, Warren I. Cohen; Columbia University Press, 1978.

External links
Greene, Roger Sherman, 1881-1947. Papers: Guide Houghton Library, Harvard College Library
Additional papers, 1898-1925: Guide The President and Fellows of Harvard College
Sherman Genealogy Including Families of Essex, Suffolk and Norfolk, England By Thomas Townsend Sherman
Find A Grave Memorial
Library of Congress
The Mysterious 'Pavilion Dollars' of 1921
China Medical Board Centennial
Western Medicine in China, 1800-1950
The Rockefeller Foundation, China, and Cultural Change
Reproductive Subjects: The Global Politics of Health in China, 1927-1964
The Great Manchurian Plague of 1910-1911

Greene, Roger Sherman II
Greene, Roger Sherman II
Harvard University alumni
Greene, Roger Sherman II